Rikon railway station is a railway station in the Swiss canton of Zürich. The station is situated in the village of Rikon im Tösstal within the municipality of Zell. It is located on the Tösstalbahn between Winterthur and Rapperswil, and is served by Zürich S-Bahn lines S26 and after the timetable change of 2019 even S11.

Gallery

References

External links 

Rikon station on Swiss Federal Railway's web site

Railway stations in the canton of Zürich
Swiss Federal Railways stations